The Maharashtra Open (known as Tata Open Maharashtra for sponsorship reasons) is an annual men's ATP Tour 250 Tennis championship in Pune. It is a part of the ATP Tour. 

Maharashtra Lawn Tennis Association (MLTA), the governing body of Tennis in Maharashtra state annually organised at Shree Shiv Chhatrapati Sports Complex. Its a hard court championship and men's singles and doubles matches are organised.

The inaugural event was held in New Delhi. It was then shifted to Chennai since its second edition, and from there it was moved to Pune in 2018, where it is held in January. The tournament is owned and organized by  RISE Worldwide. It is the only tour level tennis event currently held in India. It is also the only South Asia's ATP tour professional tennis event. 

Tallon Griekspoor of Netherlands is the current title holder in singles and Belgi'm’s Sander Gille  and Joran Vliegen are the current title holder in doubles by winning finals in 2023.

History 

Maharashtra Open is held since 1996. In its first year it was located in New Delhi, then in Chennai where it was renamed as Chennai Open. The championship moved from there to Pune, a city of Maharashtra, in 2018 and was rebranded as Maharashtra Open.

In 2021 due to COVID-19 and clash of dates with Australian Open it was not organised.

Stadium
Maharashtra Open is annually held at Mhalunge Balewadi Tennis Complex at Pune in India. It is a hard court championship.

Past finals

Singles

Doubles

Sponsors 
 Tata motors (Title sponsor)
 MMRDA
 1xBat
 Panchshil
 Dunlop
 Indian tree (apparel partner)
 IMG 
Source -

Television broadcast 

Maharashtra Open is live and exclusively airs on Sports 18 HD channel and live streams on Jio cinema app in India.

See also
 Sports in India
 WTA Indian Open

References

External links 

ATP tournament profile

Maharashtra Open
Sports competitions in Pune
ATP Tour
Hard court tennis tournaments
Tennis tournaments in India
Recurring sporting events established in 1996
1996 establishments in Maharashtra
Pune
Maharashtra